Luis Alonso Sandoval Oliva (born 27 September 1981) is a Mexican former professional footballer.

Career
Sandoval started his professional career with Chivas Guadalajara in 2002, but playing more as a winger, a style he still uses as a striker. He was sold to Jaguares due to Chivas' frequent uprising of young players, but rumored disciplinary trouble. There Sandoval got to play more time, but two seasons later for the Apertura 2006 season, he was traded to Veracruz. In the Clausura 2008 season, he was sold to Tecos UAG, where he so far has been a constant starting player under both former coach Jose Luis Trejo and current coach Miguel Herrera's management. As of December 16, 2008, Sandoval has been sent on loan for 1 year to C.F. Monterrey and signed in July 2009 with Morelia, the club loaned him after four months in late December 2009 to Club América. On the night of April 4, 2010 Sandoval enters during the 2nd half of the Mexican super classic (El Súper Clásico (Mexico)) facing the team that gave birth to his playing career (Chivas Guadalajara). However, the match ended with a 1–0 victory for Guadalajara.

Personal life
In early February 2021, Sandoval was arrested in Illinois for having 2.2 pounds of cocaine in his vehicle.

International appearances
As of 1 March 2006

Honours
Mexico U23
CONCACAF Olympic Qualifying Championship: 2004

References

External links
 

1980 births
Living people
Mexico international footballers
Association football forwards
C.D. Guadalajara footballers
C.D. Veracruz footballers
Chiapas F.C. footballers
Tecos F.C. footballers
Liga MX players
C.F. Monterrey players
Atlético Morelia players
Club Necaxa footballers
Club América footballers
Atlas F.C. footballers
Footballers from Guadalajara, Jalisco
Mexican footballers